Amitash  (born 12 October 1990) is an Indian actor who primarily works in Tamil films. He has starred in films such as Velaiilla Pattadhari (2014), Bruce Lee - The Fighter (2015), Heartbeats  (2017), and Vaanam Kottatum (2020).

Personal life 
Amitash was born in Dharwad, Karnataka and brought up in Chennai. He did his schooling in Bala Vidya Mandir, and Master's degree(Msc) in Electronic Media from Anna University. He did his Diploma in acting from Anupam Kher's institute in Bombay called An Actor Prepares. Amitash was enrolled in Little Theatre, a popular theatre group in Chennai at the age of 8, and came on stage in his first play with them. He went on to pursue his acting talent in many of their plays as well as school plays. His association with several experienced and eminent theatre directors and theatre groups like Madras Players shaped his perspectives on acting. He founded Theatron, a theatre club in Anna University, the first of its kind in that institution and introduced many students to stage plays. Under that banner, he directed several plays. He has also directed many other plays. 

Amitash is also a singer. He has to his credit a Cover Sing For The Moment, which is a tribute to "Laal Ishq". During the pandemic lockdown of 2020, he has sung and performed in independent Tamil music videos called "Corona Kannala" and "Arakkiye".

Career 
Vaaranam Aayiram was his introduction to films, albeit a tiny role, just as he completed his schooling. His professional acting breakthrough came in 2014 with the Tamil film  Velaiyilla Pattadhari, in which he plays the role of the main antagonist against Dhanush. The film went on to make waves as the highest grossing Tamil film of 2014 and Amitash got recognition. Telugu film director Srinu Vaitla cast him in his Telugu film Bruce Lee - The Fighter, marking his Telugu debut. He made his Hollywood debut in the year 2015 with playing male lead in the movie Heartbeats directed by Duane Adler of the Step Up  series was a significant phase for Amitash. He plays the role of Aseem Kapoor, an Indian choreographer with whom Krystal Ellsworth, an American dancer falls in love and the film celebrates their love and the tough path they had to tread. He played a supporting role alongside Aishwarya Rajesh and Shanthanu Bhagyaraj in Vaanam Kottattum (2020). Amitash is a part of an anthology called Kutty Story by four eminent directors of South and he features in A. L. Vijay's episode along with Megha Akash. His next film Thalli Pogathey, a remake of the Telugu film Ninnu Kori sees Amitash as one of the two male leads alongside Atharvaa and Anupama Parameswaran.

Theatre

Filmography

Awards

References

External links

1990 births
Living people
Kannada people
Male actors from Karnataka
Indian male film actors
Indian male stage actors
Anna University alumni
Male actors in Tamil cinema
Male actors in Telugu cinema
21st-century Indian male actors